Gullipadu railway station (station code:GLU), is an Indian Railways station in Gullipadu, a village in Visakhapatnam district of Andhra Pradesh. It lies on the Vijayawada–Chennai section and is administered under Vijayawada railway division of South Coast Railway zone.

History 
The southern part of the East Coast State Railway (from Waltair to Vijayawada) was taken over by Madras Railway in 1901.

Classification 
Gullipadu railway station is categorized as a Non-Suburban Grade-6 (NSG-6) station in the Vijayawada railway division.

References

External links 

Railway stations in Visakhapatnam district
Vijayawada railway division